Military specialisms are the chosen or assigned trade or career specialties in the armed forces which demand from the individuals achievement of qualifications, and a degree of knowledge and skill in the tradecraft to perform tasks and assignments to an acceptable level of completeness or quality.

Overview
Commonly military occupations are specific to the Arm, Service or Branch of the armed forces because of the different requirements of the personnel to operate in different environments, using different technologies and working within different operational systems.

The general term of reference to service personnel in the land component of an armed forces is a soldier, that of the naval component a sailor, that of the naval infantry component a marine, and in the air component an airman, which are sometimes also the lowest military rank in these services.

See also
Military personnel
Military Occupational Specialty

References

External links

 
Military personnel